The Binder-Léré Faunal Reserve, in south-west Chad, bordering Cameroon, was established in 1974 covering an area of . It has been designated as a Ramsar site since 2005.

Geography
The terrain which lies in an elevation range of  has rock exposures and eroded soils. It forms a transition zone between open forest and savanna woodland. The park is drained by The Mayo-Kébbi River flowing from east to west and Gauthiot Falls lies here. On the western part of the reserve there are the Léré Lake and Tréné Lake through which the Mayo-Kébbi flows. The river runs in a westerly direction, enters Cameroon, then Nigeria and finally debouches into the Niger River system. The Touboiris marsh  and Loké marsh are close to the headwaters of the Mayo-Kébbi River which is a plain area but outside the limits of the reserve.

Flora
Vegetation consists of species of leguminous tree species and Combretum woodland in the southern and northern zones of the reserve. The genera of Anogeissus and Boswellia are the dominant plants.

Fauna
Migrant Palearctic waterbirds are recorded in Léré Lake and Tréné Lake. Falco naumanni and two species of the Sahel biome are also reported from the reserve. Trichechus senegalensis is  found in fairly good numbers; 100 numbers were reported in the 1980s. However, poaching by hunters from Cameroon is very extensive and a wildlife monitoring system with village guards has been instituted.

References

Faunal reserves
Protected areas of Chad
Ramsar sites in Chad